Pararhodobacter is a Gram-negative genus of bacteria from the family of Rhodobacteraceae with one known species (Pararhodobacter aggregans). Pararhodobacter aggregans has been isolated from a marine aquaculture system from Rehovot in Israel.

References

Rhodobacteraceae
Bacteria genera
Monotypic bacteria genera